The 2009–10 Udinese Calcio season was the club's 15th consecutive and 30th overall season in Serie A. The team competed in Serie A, finishing 15th, and in the Coppa Italia, reaching the semi-finals. The highlight of Udinese's season was captain Antonio Di Natale's excellent campaign, as he finished top scorer in Serie A, or capocannoniere, with 29 goals.

Players

Squad information
As of 28 January 2010

Transfers
For all transfers and loans pertaining to Udinese for the current season, please see: 2009 summer transfers and 2009–10 winter transfers .

Summer 2009

In

Out

Winter 2009–10

In

Out

Competitions

Serie A

League table

Results summary

Results by round

Matches

Coppa Italia

Statistics

Appearances and goals

Goalscorers

Last updated: 15 May 2010

References

Udinese Calcio seasons
Udinese